Avni Institute of Art and Design is an Israeli art school located in Tel Aviv.

History
The Studia school (later Avni Institute) was established in 1936  by a group of Jewish artists. Among the founders was Aharon Avni, who became the school's first director. After Avni's death the school was renamed in his memory.

The school offers degrees in art and design and architecture. It also runs a Bachelor of Arts program in collaboration with the Open University of Israel.

The Avni Institute is located in a complex of  buildings on Eilat Street in South Tel Aviv. The buildings are named after the school's leading teachers. On the premises is a   large gallery space where students can exhibit their works.

Notable faculty and alumni

Faculty
 Tuvia Beeri
 Bianca Eshel Gershuni (also an alum)
 Pinchas Cohen Gan
 Jan Rauchwerger (also an alum)
 Moshe Sternschuss
Yehezkel Streichman
Avigdor Stematsky
 Yigal Tumarkin
 Zvi Lachman

Alumni

 Benni Efrat
 Daniel Enkaoua
 Gideon Gechtman
 Moshe Gershuni
 Moses Hacmon
 Zvi Hecker
 Menashe Kadishman
 Ram Karmi
 David Leviathan
 Ofer Lellouche
 Isaac Maimon
 Avi Schwartz
 Siona Shimshi
 Itzchak Tarkay
 Yona Wallach
 Boaz Vaadia
 Edo Rosenberg
 Idit Aharon

See also
Visual arts in Israel
Education in Israel

References

External links 
 Avni homepage 

Art schools in Israel
Universities and colleges in Tel Aviv